Matt Anderson (born 19 May 1968) is a Puerto Rican windsurfer. He competed in the men's Mistral One Design event at the 1996 Summer Olympics.

References

External links
 

1968 births
Living people
Puerto Rican male sailors (sport)
Puerto Rican windsurfers
Olympic sailors of Puerto Rico
Sailors at the 1996 Summer Olympics – Mistral One Design
Place of birth missing (living people)
20th-century Puerto Rican people